Dennis is a given name (usually male) or surname. 

Dennis may also refer to:

Places
In the United States
 Dennis, Georgia (disambiguation), multiple places
 Dennis, Kansas
 Dennis, Massachusetts, a New England town
 Dennis (CDP), Massachusetts, census-designated place in the town
 Dennis, Mississippi
 Dennis, Oklahoma
 Dennis, Texas
 Dennis, West Virginia
 Dennis Township, New Jersey

Elsewhere
 Dennis, Alberta, a locality in Canada

Companies
 Dennis Eagle, manufacturer of refuse collection trucks
 Dennis' Horseradish, a brand of horseradish grown near Delhi, Ontario, Canada
 Dennis Publishing, one of the world's leading independent publishers
 Dennis Specialist Vehicles, coachbuilder and manufacturer of specialised commercial vehicles
 Dennis Brothers, defunct British motor vehicle manufacturer
 Pizzeria Dennis, a Finnish pizzeria chain

Film, print and television
 Dennis the Squirrel, a character from the NBC/Qubo TV series VeggieTales
 Dennis, a fictional gray train from the TV series Thomas and Friends
 Dennis The Menace, a 1993 film released in the United Kingdom as Dennis
 Dennis the Menace, a US comic strip
 Dennis the Menace and Gnasher, a UK comic strip

Other uses
 Dennis railway station, railway station in Melbourne, Victoria, Australia
 List of storms named Dennis, tropical and extra-tropical cyclones bearing the name
 USS Dennis (DE-405), World War II John C. Butler-class destroyer escort in the service of the United States Navy

See also
Denis (disambiguation)
Denise (given name)